The Gust Brothers' Store is located in Baraboo, Wisconsin. It was added to the National Register of Historic Places in 2002.

It is a fine example of an Italianate commercial style building, built in 1877–78 by August and William Gust for their meat market store.  It is a two-story  grayish limestone building.  It has also been known as the Baraboo Savings Bank and as the Farmers' and Merchants' Bank, two banks which it later housed.

References

Buildings and structures in Sauk County, Wisconsin
Commercial buildings on the National Register of Historic Places in Wisconsin
Italianate architecture in Wisconsin
Commercial buildings completed in 1877
National Register of Historic Places in Sauk County, Wisconsin
Baraboo, Wisconsin
1877 establishments in Wisconsin